The following is a list of motions in parliamentary procedure and their classification according to Robert's Rules of Order Newly Revised, The Standard Code of Parliamentary Procedure, and Demeter's Manual of Parliamentary Law and Procedure.

Main motion

Subsidiary motions 

(Descending order of Precedence)§§§§§

 Robert's Rules of Order Newly Revised (RONR)

Lay on the table
Previous question
Limit or extend limits of debate
Postpone to a certain time (or postpone definitely)
Commit or refer
Amend
Postpone indefinitely  

 The Standard Code of Parliamentary Procedure (TSC)

Postpone temporarily, or table
Close debate
Limit or extend debate
Postpone to a certain time
Refer to committee
Amend

 Demeter's Manual of Parliamentary Law and Procedure (Demeter)

Lay on the table
Previous question
Limit or extend debate
Postpone to a definite time
Refer to a committee
Amend the main motion
Postpone indefinitely

Privileged motions 

(Descending order of Precedence)

 RONR

Fix the time to which to adjourn
Adjourn
Recess
Raise a question of privilege
Call for the orders of the day

 TSC

Adjourn
Recess
Raise a question of privilege

 Demeter

Fix the day to which to adjourn
Adjourn
Recess
Raise a question of privilege
Call for the orders of the day

Incidental motions 
(No order of Precedence)
Point of order
Appeal (motion)
Suspend the rules
Objection to the consideration of a question
Division of a question
Consideration by paragraph or seriatim
Division of the assembly
Motions relating to methods of voting and the polls
Motions relating to nominations
Request to be excused from a duty
Requests and inquiries
Parliamentary inquiry
Request for information
Request for permission to withdraw or modify a motion
Request to read papers
Request for any other privilege

Motions that bring a question again before the assembly 

 Bring a Question back motions (RONR)

Rescind or amend something previously adopted
Discharge a committee
Reconsider
Take from the table

 Restorative motions (TSC)

Amend a previously action
Ratify
Reconsider
Rescind
Resume Consideration

 Restoratory motions (Demeter)

Ratify
Expunge
Rescind
Reconsider and Enter
Reconsider
Take from the table

References 
 
 
 

Motions (parliamentary procedure)